Arandas is a crater in the Mare Acidalium quadrangle of Mars, located 42.77° North and 15.17° West.

Gullies are visible in Arandas. On the basis of their form, aspects, positions, and location amongst an apparent interaction with features thought to be rich in water ice, many researchers believed that the processes carving the gullies involve liquid water. However, this remains a topic of active research.
As soon as gullies were discovered, researchers began to image many gullies over and over, looking for possible changes. By 2006, some changes were found. Later, with further analysis it was determined that the changes could have occurred by dry granular flows rather than being driven by flowing water. With continued observations many more changes were found in Gasa Crater and others. 
As further observations have been made, still more changes have been noted; since the changes occur in the winter and spring, experts tend to believe that gullies were formed from dry ice. Before-and-after images demonstrated the timing of this activity coincided with seasonal carbon-dioxide frost and temperatures that would not have allowed for liquid water. When dry ice frost changes to a gas, it may lubricate dry material to flow, especially on steep slopes.

Impact craters generally have a rim with ejecta around them, in contrast volcanic craters usually do not have a rim or ejecta deposits. The peak is caused by a rebound of the crater floor following the impact. Sometimes craters expose layers that were buried. Rocks from deep underground are tossed onto the surface. Hence, craters can expose what lies deep under the surface.

See also 

 Impact event
 List of craters on Mars
 Mare Acidalium quadrangle
 Martian Gullies
 Ore resources on Mars
 Planetary nomenclature
 Water on Mars

References 

Impact craters on Mars
Mare Acidalium quadrangle